This is a list of Mormons, or members the Church of Jesus Christ of Latter-day Saints (LDS Church) who are serving, or have served, in the United States Congress.

Since Utah's admittance to the Union in 1896, many members of the LDS Church have been elected to the United States Congress. A majority have been from Utah (the only state with an LDS Church majority), and most of the rest from other states in the American West.

, there are nine LDS Church members serving in Congress; three in the Senate and six in the House of Representatives. All nine are members of the Republican Party.

Senate

In addition to the senators below, former Senator Larry Pressler (R) of South Dakota joined the LDS Church after his service in Congress. Senator Kyrsten Sinema (D) of Arizona grew up in the LDS Church, but left after graduating from Brigham Young University. Senator Marco Rubio (R) of Florida was baptized as a child while living in Nevada but left the Church after his family moved back to Florida.

House of Representatives

In addition to the representatives below, former Representative Jim Gibbons (R) of Nevada and current Senator Kyrsten Sinema of Arizona grew up in the Church, but left as adults.

Territorial delegates

Elected to the House of Representatives, but not seated

See also
 Latter Day Saint political history
 List of Latter Day Saints
 List of Buddhist members of the United States Congress
 List of Hindu members of the United States Congress
 List of Jewish members of the United States Congress
 List of Muslim members of the United States Congress
 List of Quaker members of the United States Congress

References

Mormon
United States Congress
U.S. Congress